Rick and Morty is an American comic book series written by Zac Gorman (volumes 1–2), Kyle Starks (volumes 3–12), and Alex Firer (volumes 13–present) and illustrated by Marc Ellerby, based on the television series of the same name. Oni Press published the original series across 60 issues from April 1, 2015, until March 25, 2020. Using the television series' established premise of alternate timelines, the first two volumes expressly follow the Rick and Morty of a different dimension (C-132) on the "Central Finite Curve" than the protagonists of the television series so-as not to contradict its continuity, before the series switches focus over to the same Rick (C-137) and Morty of the television series following the "Head-Space" arc (#12–14) in the third volume, featuring sequel storylines to specific episodes of the series, with elements of the comic series and references to its events later being incorporated into the television series. Backup stories of the series alternate between focusing on Rick (C-137) and his Morty and various Ricks and Mortys from alternate dimensions, before the primary storyline switches focus over to yet another Rick and Morty at an unspecified point before/during the final volume of the series. In October 2022, a revival of Rick and Morty was announced for a January 2023 release date.

Several spin-off limited series based on the television series and video game Pocket Mortys have also been published, with Rick and Morty Presents, an anthology series following the franchise's supporting characters in main roles, beginning publication in 2018.

Rick and Morty ongoing series

First run (2015–2020)

Book 1

Volume 1

Volume 2

Book 2

Volume 3

Volume 4

Book 3

Volume 5

Volume 6

Book 4

Volume 7

Volume 8

Book 5

Volume 9

Volume 10

Book 6

Volume 11

Volume 12

Second run (2023–present)

Rick and Morty Presents (2018–present)

Volume 1

Volume 2

Volume 3

Volume 4

Volume 5

Limited series (2016–present)

 Rick and Morty: Lil' Poopy Superstar (2016)
 Rick and Morty: Pocket Like You Stole It (2017)
 Rick and Morty vs. Dungeons & Dragons (2018)
 On August 29, 2018, a four-issue crossover comic with the fantasy tabletop role-playing game Dungeons & Dragons was released. The series titled Rick and Morty vs. Dungeons & Dragons is co-written by Jim Zub and Patrick Rothfuss, and drawn by Troy Little. A sequel mini-series, titled Rick and Morty vs. Dungeons & Dragons Chapter II: Painscape was published from September to December 2019. It was written by Jim Zub and Sarah Stern with art by Troy Little.
 The Rick and Morty vs Dungeons and Dragons Deluxe Edition, by Rothfuss, Zub, and Little, was nominated for the 2022 "Best Graphic Album—Reprint" Eisner Award.
 Rick and Morty Go to Hell (2020)
 Rick and Morty: Ever After (2020–2021)
 Rick and Morty: Worlds Apart (2021)
 Rick and Morty: Rick's New Hat (2021)
 Rick and Morty: Corporate Assets (2021–present)
 Rick and Morty: Infinity Hour (2022)
 Rick and Morty: Crisis on C-137 (2022–present)

In other media
 In the third season episode "The Ricklantis Mixup", the Shadow Council of Ricks reference the Citadel having previously been taken over by "a goddamn Jerry", depicted in the comic series arc "A Tale of Two Jerries" from Rick and Morty #21–23.
 Prior to the fourth season episode "Childrick of Mort", Rick is shown to be attracted to planets in Rick and Morty #30 backup story "Rick and Morty in: The Most Important Lesson".
 Prior to appearing in the fourth season episode "The Old Man and the Seat", Glootie (voiced by Taika Waititi) first appears in Rick and Morty #52 backup story "Introducing: Glootie!".
 Elements of the comic series Rick and Morty Presents: Birdperson and The Flesh Curtains are adapted in the fifth season episode "Rickternal Friendshine of the Spotless Mort".
 In September 2021, Christopher Lloyd and Jaeden Martell portrayed the Rick and Morty of Dimension C-132 in the first clip of a series of promotional interstitials directed by Paul B. Cummings for the two-part fifth-season finale of the television series, "Rickmurai Jack", respectively portraying the Ricks and Mortys of Dimensions C-131 and C-137 in the following two.
 Characters from the story arc "Origin of the Vindicators" (Vindicators 1) from Rick and Morty #44 are adapted in the first season of Rick and Morty spin-off series Vindicators 2.
 The evolution of the Butter Robot into the Purpose Robot, first shown in the Rick and Morty #50 story "Morty's Mind Blowers", is continued into the sixth season episode "Full Meta Jackrick".

References

External links
  at Oni Press

Comics about extraterrestrial life
Comics set on fictional planets
Rick and Morty
Rick and Morty